The Seventh Sun of Love is a 2001 Greek drama film directed by Vangelis Serdaris. It was entered into the 24th Moscow International Film Festival.

Plot
The story occurs during Asia Minor Campaign. Aglaia, a young woman of the Greek countryside, is placed as a servant girl in a rich household of an army officer. There, she becomes the objects of desire in the people surround her, the army officer, his wife and servant soldier of the officer. The political events of this turbulent period affect and determine the life of the protagonists.

Cast
 Katerina Papadaki
 Thodoris Skourtas
 Hrysanthos Pavlou
 Elena Maria Kavoukidou
 Thalia Prokopiou
 Zlatina Todeva
 Tasia Pantazopoulou
 Haris Emmanuel
 Stefanos Gulyamdzhis
 Pavlos Visariou
 Nikos Kefalas

Reception

Awards
winner: 
2001: Greek State Film Awards for Best Director (Vangelis Serdaris)
2001: Greek State Film Awards for Best Screen Play (Vangelis Serdaris)
2001: Greek State Film Awards for Best Editing 
2001: Greek State Film Awards for Best Film (2nd place)

nominated:
2002: Moscow International Film Festival

References

External links
 

2001 films
2001 drama films
Greek drama films
2000s Greek-language films